Brandon Phinney (born April 27, 1988) is an American politician and former member of the New Hampshire House of Representatives, representing Strafford County's 24th district.

Career
Phinney earned his associate degree from Great Bay Community College and his bachelor's degree from Southern New Hampshire University. In 2016, he was elected to the New Hampshire House of Representatives as a Republican, beating his Democratic opponent by just 116 votes. There, he became notable in atheist circles as the only openly atheist Republican legislator in the United States. On June 27, 2017 he announced in a press conference that he had changed his party affiliation to Libertarian.

Phinney was defeated for re-election in a three-way race, finishing in third place with 10% of the total vote. He was succeeded by Republican Mona Perreault. Following his defeat, he announced he would run for Rochester City Council in 2019.

Electoral history

2016

2018

See also
 Max Abramson

References

1988 births
Living people
American atheists
Libertarian Party (United States) officeholders
Republican Party members of the New Hampshire House of Representatives
New Hampshire Libertarians
Southern New Hampshire University alumni